Encanto is a 2021 American computer-animated musical fantasy comedy film produced by Walt Disney Animation Studios and distributed by Walt Disney Studios Motion Pictures. It was directed by Jared Bush and Byron Howard, co-directed by Charise Castro Smith, and produced by Yvett Merino and Clark Spencer. The film features original songs written by Lin-Manuel Miranda and a score composed by Germaine Franco. Stephanie Beatriz, María Cecilia Botero, John Leguizamo, Mauro Castillo, Jessica Darrow, Angie Cepeda, Carolina Gaitán, Diane Guerrero, and Wilmer Valderrama voice the Madrigals, a multigenerational Colombian family. They are led by Alma, the matriarch, whose children and grandchildren—except for Mirabel (Beatriz)—receive magical gifts from a miracle that helps them serve their rural community. When Mirabel learns that the family's magic is fading, she sets out to find out what is happening.

Premiered at the El Capitan Theatre in Los Angeles on November 3, 2021, the film was released theatrically in the United States on November 24 for a limited 30-day run due to the COVID-19 pandemic. Encanto grossed over $255 million worldwide and became the second highest-grossing animated film of 2021, behind Sing 2. It was met with wider commercial success after its release on Disney+ on December 24, 2021, propelled by viral internet popularity. The film has received acclaim from critics, who praised its music, animation, diversity, and portrayal of family dynamics.

The film and its soundtrack have received various awards and nominations. It garnered three Golden Globe nominations at the 79th ceremony, winning for the Best Animated Feature Film. The National Board of Review named Encanto the Best Animated Film of 2021. It won three of nine nominations at the 49th Annie Awards. At the 94th Academy Awards, the film received three Oscar nominations, including Best Original Score and Best Original Song (for "Dos Oruguitas"), and won for Best Animated Feature. In 2023, Encanto won three awards for its score, soundtrack, and the song "We Don't Talk About Bruno" at the Grammy Awards's 65th ceremony. Various critic circles have also picked Encanto as the best animated feature film of the year.

Accolades

Notes

References

External links
 

Encanto
Encanto